Archie Irvine (25 June 1946 - 6 September 2020) was a Scottish footballer, who played for Airdrie, Sheffield Wednesday, Doncaster Rovers and Scunthorpe United.

References

External links

1946 births
Living people
Footballers from Coatbridge
Association football midfielders
Scottish footballers
Armadale Thistle F.C. players
Airdrieonians F.C. (1878) players
Sheffield Wednesday F.C. players
Doncaster Rovers F.C. players
Scunthorpe United F.C. players
Scottish Football League players
English Football League players